Walter Craig Jelinek (born August 8, 1952) is an American businessman, president and CEO of Costco since 2012, when he succeeded the company's founder, James Sinegal.

Early life 
On August 8, 1952, Jelinek was born in Los Angeles, California. In 1970, Jelinek graduated from Antelope Valley High School.

Education 
In 1975, Jelinek earned a bachelor's degree from San Diego State University.

Career 
Jelinek started his career at FedMart.

In 1981, Jelinek joined Lucky Stores. In 1984, he joined Costco as a warehouse manager and became CEO in 2012.

Jelinek also sits on Costco Wholesale UK Ltd's board.

In 2018, Jelinek's annual base salary was $800,000 as stated by The Puget Sound Business Journal.

In 2020, Jelinek's base salary was $1,000,000 and total compensation was $8,279,552 as per SEC filing by Costco.

Awards 
 2019 Peter G. Peterson Business Statesmanship Award. Presented by Committee for Economic Development.

See also 
 Jeffrey Brotman
 Hamilton E. James

References

External links 
 An Interview With Costco CEO Craig Jelinek (2013)
 

1953 births
Living people
American chief executives
Costco people
20th-century American businesspeople
21st-century American businesspeople
San Diego State University alumni
Antelope Valley High School alumni